Whiplash is a 2013 American drama short film written and directed by Damien Chazelle. It depicts the relationship between an impassioned and gifted  jazz drummer (Johnny Simmons) and an abusive bandleader (J. K. Simmons). It is the short film on which the feature film is based.

Whiplash premiered at the 2013 Sundance Film Festival on January 18, 2013, where it won the Short Film Jury Prize. It was then adapted to a feature film, which won three Academy Awards.

Plot 
Andrew Neiman is a first-year student at the prestigious Shaffer Conservatory in New York City. He has been playing drums from a young age, and he aspires to become a world-class drummer. Fletcher, conductor and bandleader of Shaffer Conservatory Studio Band, invites him into the ensemble as alternate for core drummer Carl. However, Andrew quickly discovers that Fletcher is strict and abusive to his students. When the band rehearses the Hank Levy piece "Whiplash" and Andrew struggles to keep the tempo, Fletcher hurls a chair at him, slaps him, and berates him in front of the ensemble.

Cast 
 Johnny Simmons as Andrew Neiman
 J. K. Simmons as Fletcher
 Nate Lang as Carl
 C.J. Vana as Metz

Production 
While attending Princeton High School, writer-director Damien Chazelle was in a "very competitive" jazz band and drew on the dread he felt in those years. He based the conductor, Terence Fletcher, on his former band instructor (who died in 2003) but "pushed it further," adding elements of Buddy Rich and other band leaders known for their harsh treatment. Chazelle said he wrote the film "initially in frustration" while trying to get his musical La La Land off the ground.

Right of Way Films and Blumhouse Productions helped Chazelle turn 15 pages of his original screenplay into the short film. The short's acclaim after debuting at the 2013 Sundance Film Festival attracted investors to produce the complete version of the script.

Reception 
The short film was very well received at Sundance, being compared to Full Metal Jacket, and winning the Short Film Jury Prize.

Accolades

References

External links 
 

2013 independent films
2013 short films
2013 films
American independent films
American drama short films
Films about educators
Films about harassment
Films about percussion and percussionists
Films produced by Jason Blum
Films directed by Damien Chazelle
Films set in New York City
Films set in schools
Films with screenplays by Damien Chazelle
Jazz films
Sundance Film Festival award winners
Blumhouse Productions films
2010s English-language films
2010s American films